is a former Japanese football player who is the current first-team coach J2 League club of Tokyo Verdy.

Playing career
Hosaka was born in Saitama on July 23, 1970. After graduating from Tokai University, he joined Yomiuri (later Verdy Kawasaki) in 1990. He played on the reserve team until 1992. Although he was promoted to the top team in 1992, he did not play in any matches. In 1994, he moved to his local club, the Urawa Reds. In early 1994, he became a regular player as defensive midfielder. However he did not play in matches starting in late 1994. In 1996, he moved to the Japan Football League club Fujitsu (later Kawasaki Frontale). He retired at the end of the 1998 season.

Club statistics

References

External links

1970 births
Living people
Tokai University alumni
Association football people from Saitama Prefecture
Japanese footballers
Japan Soccer League players
J1 League players
Japan Football League (1992–1998) players
Tokyo Verdy players
Urawa Red Diamonds players
Kawasaki Frontale players
Association football midfielders